Marquis Mu of Cai (蔡穆侯) (?–646 BC), born Jī Xī (姫肸), was the fourteenth ruler of the State of Cai from 675 BC to 646 BC.  He was the only known son of Marquess Ai of Cai (蔡哀侯), his predecessor. His reign was a period of 29 years. He was succeeded by his son.

References 
 Shiji
 Chinese Wikipedia
 Chinese Text Project
 chinaknowledge.de/History/Zhou/rulers-cai

Zhou dynasty nobility
Cai (state)
7th-century BC Chinese monarchs